Eduardo Herrera (born 28 April 1965) is a Colombian professional golfer. Herrera was the first Colombian golfer to feature in the top 100 of the Official World Golf Rankings.

Amateur career
Herrera represented Colombia in the Eisenhower Cup in 1986 and although his team did not win, he had the best 72-hole score out of all the competitors in a field that included Jesper Parnevik, Colin Montgomerie, Jay Sigel, Billy Andrade, Peter McEvoy, Jean van de Velde and Peter O'Malley.

Professional career
Herrera played on the Japan Golf Tour from 1988 until 2001 where he won 5 tournaments. He played on the PGA Tour in 2002 after earning his card through qualifying school in 2001. Herrera only made 7 of 23 cuts in 2002 and was not able to retain his tour card. He earned $109,953 and finished in 196th on the money list. His best finish came at the B.C. Open where he finished in 8th. He dropped down to the second tier Nationwide Tour from 2003 to 2005. While on the Nationwide Tour, Herrera made 28 of 48 cuts, recorded three top-10 finishes, 10 top-25 finishes and earned $133,444. His best finish on the money list came in 2003 when he finished in 70th. Herrera finished in 3rd place at the 2008 Asian Tour qualifying school to earn his Asian Tour card for 2009.

Professional wins (9)

Japan Golf Tour wins (5)

*Note: The 1998 Dydo Drinco Shizuoka Open was shortened to 54 holes due to weather.

Japan Golf Tour playoff record (0–2)

Tour de las Américas wins (2)
2003 Mexican Open
2009 TLA Players Championship

Japan Challenge Tour wins (1)
1989 Korakuen Cup (2nd)

Other wins (1)
2008 Mercedes Championship (Brazil)

Results in major championships

Note: Herrera only played in The Open Championship.

CUT = missed the half-way cut
"T" = tied

Colombian national team appearances
Amateur
Eisenhower Trophy: 1986 (individual leader)

Professional
World Cup: 1988, 1989, 2005

See also
2001 PGA Tour Qualifying School graduates

References

External links

Colombian male golfers
Asian Tour golfers
Japan Golf Tour golfers
PGA Tour golfers
1965 births
Living people

es:Eduardo Herrera